Alexandre Belinga (born 25 August 1962) is a Cameroonian football coach who once coached the Cameroon national team.

As a player, he was a squad member for the 1981 FIFA World Youth Championship.

References

1962 births
Living people
Place of birth missing (living people)
Cameroon youth international footballers
Cameroonian football managers
Cameroon national football team managers
Association footballers not categorized by position
Association football players not categorized by nationality